The Tom Longboat Awards were established in 1951 to recognize Aboriginal athletes "for their outstanding contributions to sport in Canada"  and continues "to honour Indigenous athletes across Canada" annually. As a program of the Aboriginal Sport Circle, the awards provide a forum for acknowledging top male and female athletes both at the regional and national levels.

The Aboriginal Sport Circle offers each provincial and territorial Aboriginal sport body (P/T/TASB) the opportunity to select one male and one female Aboriginal athlete within their region. The regional recipients will be considered as nominees for the national award that is presented to the top male and female athletes at the annual induction ceremony hosted by Canada's Sports Hall of Fame.

Each of the regional Tom Longboat Award recipients receives a Tom Longboat Award medallion.  The two national Tom Longboat Award winners receive Tom Longboat Award rings, and have their names added to the Tom Longboat Award Trophy, which is displayed in Canada's Sports Hall of Fame.

Award history 
"Of all the athletes in Canadian sport history, only a select few have a major award named in their honour." The Tom Longboat Awards are named in honour of Tom Longboat, a member of the Onondaga Nation from Six Nations of the Grand River who in the early 1900s made a name for himself as a long-distance runner, competing in races across North America and Europe.  "In 1999, Maclean's magazine named him Canada's greatest sports legend of the 20th century. Befitting a hero, the Tom Longboat Award has been given since 1951 to the best aboriginal male and female amateur athletes in the country".

The Tom Longboat Awards were established in 1951 as a joint effort of the Department of Indian Affairs and the Amateur Athletic Union of Canada (AAUC). Between 1951 and 1972, Indian Affairs and the AAUC shared responsibility for the awards. Indian Affairs managed the awards at the local and regional levels, while the AAUC directed activities nationally. Responsibility of the awards shifted to the National Indian Brotherhood / Assembly of First Nations and Canadian Amateur Sports Federation (1973-1998) and since 1998, the Awards have been administered by the Aboriginal Sport Circle, the organization representing Aboriginal sport and recreation development in Canada.

Principles 
The Tom Longboat Award recognizes Aboriginal athletes who have attained significant personal achievements in sport. "In addition to their athletic achievements, recipients will have demonstrated a personal commitment to the principles of sportsmanship and fair play, while reflecting a holistic lifestyle as an Aboriginal Athlete".

Eligibility 
The Tom Longboat Award honours the accomplishments of athletes within a given program year (September 1 to August 31). Applicants must meet the following criteria to be eligible as nominees:

 Applicants must be of Aboriginal descent (inclusive of First Nations, Inuit and Métis)
 Applicants must be active within the year of nomination
 Applicants must demonstrate sportsmanship, fair play and ethics in sport
 Applicants must complete a nomination package and submit it to their P/TASB on or before the set deadline

Tom Longboat Award winners  
The following is a list of Tom Longboat Award winners Nationally and Regionally

References

External links 
 Tom Longboat Awards

Awards established in 1951
1951 establishments in Canada
Canadian sports trophies and awards
Awards honoring indigenous people
Indigenous sports and games of the Americas
First Nations sportspeople